General elections were held in Costa Rica on 5 February 1978. Rodrigo Carazo Odio of the Unity Coalition won the presidential election, whilst his party also won the parliamentary election. Voter turnout was 81.3%.

Carazo, a former congressman and former member of the National Liberation Party (probably Costa Rica's main political force), left the party several years before and created his own: Democratic Renovation, but a deeply split opposition on the 1974 election caused PLN's easy victory. With that in mind, main leaders of the non-Marxist opposition started talks in order to present a unified candidature.

Eventually these talks came through and the main parties in the opposition at the right of the government achieved an agreement; going into a primary election to choose the common nominee. Rodrigo Carazo faced wealthy industrial Miguel Barzuna winning by small margin. Even when some leaders left the coalition after this (most notably Jorge Gonzalez Marten from the National Independent Party and former president Mario Echandi) most of the leadership remained united. The Unity Coalition was created out of the joining of four parties: Carazo's Democratic Renovation, former president José Joaquín Trejos’ People's Union, Rafael Calderón Fournier (son of Calderonist leader Rafael Calderón Guardia) Republican Party and Dr. Jorge Arturo Monge's Christian Democratic Party (the smallest one of the coalition but the most ideologically coherent).

The Left also made a coalition; the three main far-left parties at the Left of PLN; Popular Vanguard, Costa Rican Socialist Party and Revolutionary People's Movement made the United People coalition, nominating former PLN member and doctor Rodrigo Gutierrez. Gutierrez had no possibilities to be president but the coalition did help the Left having a higher voting than usual and a large group in Congress. For many historians this election marks the beginning of Costa Rica's two-party system.

President

By province

Parliament

By province

Local governments

Ballot

References

1978 elections in Central America
1978 in Costa Rica
Elections in Costa Rica